Scream VI is a 2023 American slasher film directed by Matt Bettinelli-Olpin and Tyler Gillett, and written by James Vanderbilt and Guy Busick. It is the sequel to Scream (2022) and the sixth installment in the Scream film series. The film stars Melissa Barrera, Jasmin Savoy Brown, Mason Gooding, Jenna Ortega, Hayden Panettiere, and Courteney Cox, all reprising their roles from previous installments, alongside Jack Champion, Henry Czerny, Liana Liberato, Dermot Mulroney, Devyn Nekoda, Tony Revolori, Josh Segarra, and Samara Weaving. Scream VI follows a new Ghostface killer who targets the survivors of the "Woodsboro legacy attacks" in New York City.

A sixth Scream film was announced just weeks after the successful debut of Scream (2022), with much of the cast signing on to reprise their roles. Filming took place in Montreal, Canada, from June through August 2022. Like its predecessors, the film combines the violence of the slasher genre with elements of black comedy and a "whodunit" mystery, and satirizes the trends of film franchises and subversion of audience expectations. Neve Campbell did not reprise her role as Sidney Prescott because she felt the offer presented to her was unacceptable, making this the first Scream film not to feature her.

Scream VI premiered at the AMC Lincoln Square Theater in Manhattan on March 6, 2023, and was theatrically released in the United States on March 10 by Paramount Pictures. The film has grossed over $116 million worldwide and received generally positive reviews from critics, who praised the kills and performances.

Plot 
One year after the Woodsboro killings orchestrated by Richie Kirsch and Amber Freeman, Blackmore University professor Laura Crane is catfished by her student Jason Carvey, who lures her outside a bar in New York City and kills her while wearing a Ghostface costume. Jason plots with his roommate Greg to kill sisters Sam and Tara Carpenter to finish what Richie and Amber started, but Jason receives a call from a different Ghostface, who has murdered Greg and subsequently stabs Jason to death.

Sam and Tara now live in New York City and attend Blackmore with fellow survivors Chad and Mindy Meeks-Martin, along with their roommate Quinn, Mindy's girlfriend Anika, and Chad's roommate Ethan. Sam attends therapy with Dr. Stone and is ostracized in public due to an online conspiracy theory that she was the true mastermind of the latest Woodsboro killings. Quinn's father, Detective Wayne Bailey, calls Sam in for questioning as her ID was found at the scene of Jason's murder, along with the Ghostface mask that was used in the previous year's killings. On the way to the station, Sam is called by Ghostface from Richie's phone, who then attacks Tara and pursues them into a bodega, killing multiple bystanders, and leaving behind another Ghostface mask used in the 2011 Woodsboro killings.

At the station, the sisters meet with FBI special agent Kirby Reed, a survivor of the 2011 killings. They also encounter reporter Gale Weathers, who reveals that Sidney Prescott and her family have gone into hiding in response to the recent attacks. Dr. Stone is murdered by Ghostface, who steals Sam's file and leaves the mask used in the Hollywood killings. Ghostface then attacks the group in Sam and Tara's apartment, killing Quinn and Anika, and leaves the mask used in the Windsor College killings. Wayne is officially taken off the case following Quinn's death, but vows to help the group and avenge his daughter. Gale takes the group to an abandoned cinema she found while investigating, which has been set up as a shrine to the Ghostface killers, including weapons and outfits from each set of attacks. Ghostface later calls Gale at her apartment and torments her about the death of Dewey Riley, before killing her boyfriend and attacking her. Sam and Tara arrive just in time to stop Ghostface from killing Gale.

The group agree to meet Kirby at the theater to trap Ghostface. On the subway platform, they are separated, and Mindy is stabbed by Ghostface. At the theater, Sam sees a vision of her father, original Ghostface killer Billy Loomis, who reminds her to defend herself and not trust anyone. Taking Billy's knife from the original murders, Sam realizes they have been locked inside. Wayne calls Sam and says he found out Kirby was fired from the FBI months prior for being mentally unstable. Two Ghostfaces appear and attack Chad. As Tara and Sam try to escape, Kirby and Wayne both arrive with guns drawn. Wayne shoots Kirby, revealing himself as a third Ghostface. He admits to orchestrating the killings with his children, revealed to be Ethan and a still-alive Quinn, to avenge the death of his eldest son Richie. They reveal their plan to kill Sam and frame her as Ghostface, making her corpse the final piece of the shrine to honor Richie. Sam and Tara fight off the Bailey family, with Tara stabbing Ethan and Sam killing Quinn. Sam then dons her father's Ghostface costume and stabs Wayne to death. Ethan resurfaces, but Kirby smashes the television set that killed Stu Macher over his head, killing him.

Sam agrees to let Tara live her life more independently and Tara agrees to go to therapy. As the still-alive Mindy, Chad, and Kirby are taken to the hospital, Sam stares at her father's Ghostface mask before discarding it and following Tara into the city.

Cast 

Additionally, Jack Quaid reprises his role as Richie Kirsch from Scream (2022) in an uncredited video cameo.

Production

Development 
Prior to the release of Scream 4 (2011), series creator Kevin Williamson claimed he had already "mapped out" Scream 5 and Scream 6, but would wait to see the box office success of the fourth installment before signing on for any more films. In July 2014, Williamson revealed that Scream 4 was intended to kick off a new trilogy of films, but the film "never took off in a way they hoped". Williamson also said that he would likely not be involved in any further entries, as the series director Wes Craven and his team were "done" with him. In Williamson's initial pitch, Scream 5 saw Jill Roberts being stalked by a killer at her college campus, while Scream 6 would feature Gale Weathers as the main character and deal with her relationship with Dewey Riley.

In January 2022, Neve Campbell, David Arquette, Matt Bettinelli-Olpin, and Tyler Gillett expressed interest in making future films in the series. Courteney Cox  would later express an interest in a sequel while doing publicity for Shining Vale. A sixth film was officially green-lit on February 3, 2022, by Spyglass Media Group. Olpin and Gillett of Radio Silence would return to direct while James Vanderbilt and Guy Busick would write the script once again. By the end of the month, Campbell was approached to return for the film. The following month, Cox had received the script and was courted to reprise her role. Also in March 2022, the sixth film's release date was set for March 31, 2023. By May, plot details emerged, setting the film outside of Woodsboro. Instead, the film will take place in New York City. In June, Ortega said the film would feature a more "aggressive and violent" Ghostface than in previous entries.

Casting 
In May 2022, it was announced that Melissa Barrera, Jasmin Savoy Brown, Mason Gooding, and Jenna Ortega would also return for the sixth film. The following day, it was announced that Hayden Panettiere would reprise her role of Kirby Reed from the fourth film. When asked about her involvement in the film, Cox claimed that her contract was not yet completed. Also in June, it was announced that Dermot Mulroney had joined the cast, playing a police officer, and Cox officially confirmed her involvement with the film. On June 16, Jack Champion, Liana Liberato, Devyn Nekoda and Josh Segarra joined the cast, followed by Henry Czerny on June 23. Samara Weaving and Tony Revolori were both announced as cast members on July 14.

Campbell's involvement 
On June 6, 2022, it was announced Campbell would not be returning as Sidney Prescott for the sixth film. The actress made a statement about how her contract and salary negotiations had stalled with Paramount Pictures:

Campbell expanded on her statement a few weeks later, saying she could not bear "walking on set and feeling undervalued" and that the offer would have been different had she been a man.

IndieWire noted Campbell had spent 26 years acting in the franchise and announced it was "the end of an era". David Arquette stated, "I'd love for her to be a part of it. A Scream movie without Sidney is kind of unfortunate, but I understand her decision. It's all a business in a way, they have to balance all these elements to fit a budget and produce a film." Jasmin Savoy Brown and Melissa Barreraas well as former Scream co-stars Emma Roberts, Sarah Michelle Gellar, Matthew Lillard, and Jamie Kennedyalso expressed their support for Campbell's decision and praised her contributions to the series. In March 2023, Courteney Cox told Variety that she missed working with Campbell on the movie but was going to "support whatever she feels is right".

Even though she will not be in the film, the script still contains references to the Sidney character and is "protective" of her.

In December 2022, Radio Silence commented on Campbell's absence, saying her absence affected the script "greatly." However, in March 2023, the pair said the script had changed "very little" since Campbell had exited "early enough in the process". In both instances, they said they decided to use the change as an opportunity to focus more on other characters, particularly the four young survivors from the previous film. They also mentioned how much they love both Campbell and the Sidney character and that she could return in future installments.

Filming 
On a production budget of $33–35million, principal photography began on June 9, 2022, in Montreal, Canada. Vanderbilt, Paul Neinstein and William Sherak produced under Project X Entertainment, while Chad Villella, Cathy Konrad, Marianne Maddalena and Williamson served as executive producers. Hayden Panettiere posed for a set photo on August 6, along with Jasmin Savoy Brown, that was picked up by various media outlets given her return to the franchise. Courteney Cox revealed she had finished filming her part as of August 14. Filming ended in late August.

The film's climax features a projection of a fictional movie made by the character Richie Kirsch. Some of the footage shown is actually from actor Jack Quaid's real-life home videos, interspliced with footage for the film, with voiceovers also provided by Quaid. The film features many homages and items from previous films inside the theater museum. The items used were not actually the original props from previous films but rather were recreated by the film's art and costume departments.

Music

The film is scored by Brian Tyler, returning from the previous installment. In January 2023, it was announced that Sven Faulconer would join Tyler to co-score the film. In February 2023, it was revealed by Linkin Park's Mike Shinoda during an interview with KROQ that he would be releasing a solo song as part of the Scream VI soundtrack. American singer Demi Lovato released "Still Alive" on March 3, by Island Records, as the lead single of the film's soundtrack. Shinoda's song, called "In My Head", was released on March 10, featuring Kailee Morgue.

Release 
Scream VI had its world premiere at AMC Lincoln Square Theater on March 6, 2023. The film was released in the United States on March 10, 2023, by Paramount Pictures. It was originally set for release on March 31, 2023. The film was released in RealD 3D, 4DX and Dolby Cinema formats.

Marketing 
In several cities, a viral marketing stunt occurred, as the studio's marketing firm sent individuals wearing a Ghostface costume and mask to stand motionless in front of cameras and walk around the streets, resulting in multiple 911 calls from unsettled residents. The marketing campaign also included the launch of a website that allowed American users to receive personalized phone calls from Ghostface, Scream-themed meals in different Chain pop-up dinners and an immersive walk-through featuring props and reconstructed sets from the franchise in California; the walk-throughs included appearances by directors and producers Radio Silence, along with actors Mason Gooding, Dermot Mulroney and Tony Revolori.

Reception

Box office 
, Scream VI has grossed $76million in the United States and Canada, and $40million in other territories, for a worldwide total of $116 million.

In the United States and Canada, Scream VI was released alongside 65 and Champions, and was projected to gross $35–40million from 3,670 theaters in its opening weekend. The film made $19.3million on its first day, including $5.7million from Thursday night previews. It went on to debut to $44.4million, marking the highest opening weekend of the franchise and finishing first at the box office. Of the opening weekend audience, 71 percent of the audience was between the ages of 18 and 34 (with 42 percent being between 18 and 24), while 51 percent were male. It made $17.5 million in its second weekend, finishing second behind newcomer Shazam! Fury of the Gods.

Critical response 
On the review aggregator website Rotten Tomatoes, the film holds an approval rating of 77% based on 258 reviews, and an average rating of 6.8/10. The site's critical consensus reads, "Certain aspects of horror's most murderously meta franchise may be going stale, but a change of setting and some inventive set pieces help keep Scream VI reasonably sharp." On Metacritic, the film has a weighted average score of 61 out of 100, based on 52 critics, indicating "generally favorable reviews". Audiences polled by CinemaScore gave the film an average grade of B+ on an A+ to F scale, the same score as Scream 2 (1997) and Scream (2022), while those at PostTrak gave it an overall 87% positive score, with 74% saying they would definitely recommend it.

Chicago Sun-Times Richard Roeper gave the film three out of four stars, writing "Nevertheless, off we go on another aggressively gruesome, wickedly funny and at times cleverly staged Scream-fest that cheerfully defies logic while hitting all the right notes we've come to expect from the franchise." He praised the performances of Barrera, Ortega and Brown and felt the film's ending was "the most outlandish and spectacularly brutal ending of all". Owen Gleiberman, writing for Variety, gave the film a positive review despite finding it "too long", noting that it "is a pretty good thriller [...] [and] a gory homicidal shell game that's clever in all the right ways, staged and shot more forcefully than the previous film, eager to take advantage of its more sprawling but enclosed cosmopolitan setting".

Benjamin Lee from The Guardian gave the film a four-star rating out of five, describing it as gorier and a smarter follow-up to Scream (2022). Simon Thompson from The Playlist gave the film an A and described Panettiere as "the active ingredient here, the bolt from the blue, and she revels in the role, delivering a real treat for die-hard fans". In a review rated four out of five stars, Clarisse Loughrey of The Independent called the film "bloody, satisfying and ridiculously fun" and similarly praised the performance of Panettiere, who "plays the role with a sly wit".

Olly Richards, reviewing the film for Empire, gave it three out of five stars, opining that it was "still far more inventive and entertaining than most horror franchises of a similar vintage", yet "one of the sillier series entries in terms of plot, but still scary enough and funny enough to leave you hoping Ghostface might yet kill again". Frank Scheck of The Hollywood Reporter gave it a mixed review, believing the film to be a satisfying addition to the franchise by blending nostalgia with a fresh take, but concluded that it was "not exactly cutting-edge anymore".

Future 
In March 2023, directors Matt Bettinelli-Olpin and Tyler Gillet were "hopeful" for a seventh film in the series and said they would like to continue to see more movies in the franchise "whether we're involved or not". They also stated that they wanted Campbell to return in future installments, saying "we'd love to be able to make another movie with her, and we’re not giving up".

Notes

References

External links
 
 

2020s American films
2020s English-language films
2020s serial killer films
2020s slasher films
2023 films
2023 horror films
American horror thriller films
American sequel films
American serial killer films
American slasher films
Films about sisters
Films directed by Matt Bettinelli-Olpin & Tyler Gillett
Films produced by James Vanderbilt
Films set in New York City
Films shot in Montreal
Films with screenplays by Guy Busick
Films with screenplays by James Vanderbilt
Paramount Pictures films
6
Spyglass Entertainment films